Laurentius Bernardini was a Roman Catholic prelate who served as Titular Bishop of Coronea.

Biography
Laurentius Bernardini was ordained a priest in the Order of Preachers. On 27 Aug 1572, he was appointed during the papacy of Pope Gregory XIII as Titular Bishop of Coronea.On 28 Sep 1572, he was consecrated bishop by Thomas Goldwell, Bishop of Saint Asaph, with Ippolito Arrivabene, Bishop Emeritus of Hierapetra, and Giambattista de Benedictis, Bishop of Penne e Atri, serving as co-consecrators. It is uncertain how long he served as bishop of Coronea; the next bishop of record was Alonso D'Avalos who was appointed in 1598.

See also 
Catholic Church in Greece

References 

16th-century Roman Catholic titular bishops
Bishops appointed by Pope Gregory XIII